Edward Emil Knourek (February 12, 1893 – May 10, 1977) was an American track and field athlete who competed in the 1920 Summer Olympics. In 1920 he finished fourth in the pole vault competition.

References

External links
List of American track and field athletes

1893 births
1977 deaths
American male pole vaulters
Olympic track and field athletes of the United States
Athletes (track and field) at the 1920 Summer Olympics
20th-century American people